Galleria Ataköy, the first modern shopping mall in Turkey, is situated in the western suburb of Ataköy, Istanbul. It was built following the recommendation of then Prime Minister Turgut Özal, who was inspired by the shopping mall Houston Galleria in Houston, Texas, United States. Galleria Ataköy was opened in 1988 by Turgut Özal.

History
Galleria Ataköy reflected the changing face of Turkey in the late 1980s and became a symbol of modern life with the stores selling a wide range of goods, most of them imported, cafés and restaurants, which made going there a popular day out. At weekends in particular, people rushed to Galleria from all over the city. Due to its close distance to Ataköy Yacht Marina and Atatürk International Airport, Galleria was also very popular for tourists. For several years, Galleria was without any competitor, but it blazed a trail down as other shopping malls were opened in Istanbul.

Features
Galleria attracts with its 140 stores on two floors an average of 1.2 million visitors monthly. The complex housed Printemps, the renowned French department store, in the beginning. It hosts upscale Turkish stores, features fast food restaurants and cafeterias, entertainment centers, movie theaters, a bowling alley, and an ice skating rink. The shopping mall has a covered car park for 2,000 vehicles.

In 1990, Galleria was judged the world's most outstanding mall by the International Council of Shopping Centers (ICSC) for sophisticated blueprint design, rapid construction, and unique structural features.

Address: 
Sahilyolu, Ataköy - Bakırköy 
Istanbul

See also
 List of shopping malls in Istanbul
 Galleria Ice Rink

References
 From the Grand Bazaar to the modern shopping centers in Turkey. Turkish Council of Shopping Centers & Retailers (AMPD)

External links
 Official website 
 International Council of Shopping Centers

1987 establishments in Turkey
Bakırköy
Buildings and structures completed in 1987
Shopping malls in Istanbul